Metallostroy is a municipal settlement in Kolpinsky District of the federal city of St. Petersburg, Russia. Population:

History
It was established in 1931 as a settlement for workers building Kolpino Metal Factory, which explains the name of the township, its first part meaning metal, and stroy meaning construction.

First houses started to appear in the spring of 1932. The settlement was officially named Metallostroy on October 28, 1964.

Transportation
Metallostroy is passed through in two directions by train. Moscow and Volkhovstroy, in these areas located on the platform of Metallostroy and platform Izhors (Ижоры), respectively. Almost directly in the center of the  Metallostroy is a platform of Izhors. The village has a lot of bus routes, both a target and transit. These routes connect the settlement with stations of the Petersburg underground Rybatskoye, Proletarskaya and Lomonosovskaya, and as with all parts of the Kolpino District, the cities of Otradnoye on the Neva, Nikolskoye and Kirovsk.

References

External links
Internet portal of Metallostroy

Municipal settlements under jurisdiction of Saint Petersburg
Kolpinsky District